Xploder is a brand of game cheats and multimedia devices for games consoles, similar to Action Replay. Xploder products have been released for Dreamcast, PS2, PlayStation, PSP, Xbox, GameCube, Nintendo 64, Game Boy, Game Boy Advance, PC and others. Support for the PS3, Xbox 360 and Nintendo Wii started in 2006–2007. Xploder products are often bundled with accessories for game consoles, such as Lexar's Memory Sticks for the PSP, or the X-Link cable with the PS2 V5 Media Centre version. Newer versions for the Xbox 360 and PlayStation 3 allow users to download saved games from the Internet.

In 2018, a version for PlayStation 4 was available as a free download.

Utilizing the Xploder disc for the original PlayStation, users have found it possible to boot backup or copied versions of their games.

External links
Xploder

References 

Unlicensed Nintendo hardware
Game Boy accessories
Nintendo 64 accessories
Game Boy Advance
GameCube accessories
Wii accessories
Dreamcast
PlayStation (console) accessories
PlayStation 2 accessories
PlayStation 3 accessories
PlayStation 4 accessories
PlayStation Portable
Xbox (console) accessories
Xbox 360 accessories
Cheating in video games